Divagations is an 1897 prose collection by the French writer Stéphane Mallarmé. The book introduces the idea of "critical poems", a mixture between critical essays and prose poems. The book is divided into two parts, first a series of prose poems, and then the actual "divagations" - "wanderings" or "ravings".

Contents
 "Anecdotes or Poems"
 "Volumes on My Divan"
 "Capsule Sketches and Full-Length Portraits"
 "Richard Wagner"
 "Scribbled at the Theater"
 "Crisis of Verse"
 "About the Book"
 "The Mystery in Letters"
 "Services"
 "Important Miscellaneous News Briefs"

See also
 1897 in literature
 19th-century French literature
 Symbolism (arts)

References

1897 books
Essay collections
Works about symbolism (arts)
French books
Works by Stéphane Mallarmé